Khas-Magomed-Said Gilagayev (born 28 February 1970) is a retired Chechen professional footballer.

External links
 Profile at playerhistory.com

1970 births
Living people
Soviet footballers
Russian footballers
Russian Premier League players
Russian expatriate footballers
Expatriate footballers in Germany
FC Akhmat Grozny players
FC Dynamo Stavropol players
FC Chernomorets Novorossiysk players
Russian people of Chechen descent
Chechen people
Association football midfielders
FC Novokuznetsk players